The 1975 Los Angeles Dodgers finished in second place, 20 games behind the Cincinnati Reds in the Western Division of the National League.

Offseason 
 January 29, 1975: Von Joshua was selected off waivers from the Dodgers by the San Francisco Giants.

Regular season

Season standings

Record vs. opponents

Opening day lineup

Notable transactions 
 May 2, 1975: Geoff Zahn and Eddie Solomon were traded by the Dodgers to the Chicago Cubs for Burt Hooton.
 July 15, 1975: Jim Brewer was purchased from the Dodgers by the California Angels.

Roster

Player stats

Batting

Starters by position 
Note: Pos = Position; G = Games played; AB = At bats; H = Hits; Avg. = Batting average; HR = Home runs; RBI = Runs batted in

Other batters 
Note: G = Games played; AB = At bats; H = Hits; Avg. = Batting average; HR = Home runs; RBI = Runs batted in

Pitching

Starting pitchers 
Note: G = Games pitched; IP = Innings pitched; W = Wins; L = Losses; ERA = Earned run average; SO = Strikeouts

Other pitchers 
Note: G = Games pitched; IP = Innings pitched; W = Wins; L = Losses; ERA = Earned run average; SO = Strikeouts

Relief pitchers 
Note: G = Games pitched; W = Wins; L = Losses; SV = Saves; ERA = Earned run average; SO = Strikeouts

Awards and honors 
Gold Glove Award
Steve Garvey
Andy Messersmith
NL Pitcher of the Month
Don Sutton (April 1975)
Don Sutton (May 1975)
Burt Hooton (August 1975)
Burt Hooton (September 1975)
NL Player of the Week
Burt Hooton and Don Sutton (Aug. 4–10)
Andy Messersmith (Sep. 8–14)

All-Stars 
1975 Major League Baseball All-Star Game
Steve Garvey starter
Ron Cey starter
Jimmy Wynn starter
Mike Marshall reserve
Don Sutton reserve
Andy Messersmith reserve
TSN National League All-Star
Steve Garvey

Farm system

1975 Major League Baseball Draft

The Dodgers drafted 33 players in the June draft and 11 in the January draft. Of those, six players would eventually play in the Major Leagues.

The top draft pick was shortstop Mark Bradley from Elizabethtown High School in Elizabethtown, Kentucky. He spent two seasons with the Dodgers as an outfielder in 1981–82 and a third season with the New York Mets and hit .204 in 113 at-bats.

The most successful draft pick was pitcher Dave Stewart, a 16th round pick out of St. Elizabeth High School in Oakland, California. He reached the Majors in 1978 with the Dodgers and played through 1995, primarily with the Oakland Athletics. He was 168–129 with a 3.95 ERA, was a 1989 All-Star, 3 time World Series Champion, a World Series MVP and 3 time League Championship Series MVP. Following his playing career he became a coach, an agent and a General Manager.

Notes

References 
Baseball-Reference season page
Baseball Almanac season page

External links 
1975 Los Angeles Dodgers uniform
Los Angeles Dodgers official web site

Los Angeles Dodgers seasons
Los Angeles Dodgers season
Los Angel